Mitchell Llewellyn "Mitch" Peters (born 4 March 1970) is a former Virgin Islander sprinter. He was born on St. Croix, U.S. Virgin Islands. Peters was recognized for his talents at an early age winning races at sports days and setting new meet records. He started competing and traveling regularly with his junior high and high school teams to places such as Puerto Rico, other Caribbean Islands, and United States to compete.

Junior Competition Results 

Collegiate Career
Collegiately, Peters ran for Alabama A&M. He accepted an academic and athletic scholarship to attend Alabama A&M in 1988. During his time at Alabama A&M University Peters competed in both the short and long sprints and multiple relays. As a sprinter he had pretty good range from the 100m to the 800m. Peters made his mark in the record books for multiple events, a two-time NCAA All American, and a member of two SIAC Championships teams. In 1992 he graduated with a Bachelor of Science degree in Finance. Peters was inducted into the Alabama A&M University Hall of Fame in 2012.

Collegiate Conference Results

Olympic Competition Results 

After his collegiate season, at the 1992 Summer Olympics in Barcelona, Spain Peters ran for the US Virgin Islands men's 4 × 100 relay team; the team placed fifth in heat three of round one with a time 40.48, the team did not advance. Peters later competed in the men's 100m competition at the 1996 Summer Olympics in Atlanta, Georgia. He competed in the 100m. He recorded an 11.12, not enough to qualify for the next round past the heats.

Recognition
 Athletic Booster Club - Outstanding Achievement Award
 City of Huntsville, Alabama - Resolution No. 96-791
 Resolution of the Madison County Commission
 2012 Alabama A&M University Hall of Fame [https://aamusports.com/honors/hall-of-fame/mitchell-peters/193
 2019 US Virgin Islands Track & Field Federation Hall of Fame [https://stthomassource.com/content/2019/02/16/vitff-hall-of-fame-announces-its-first-class-in-recognition-of-its-55th-anniversary

References

1970 births
Living people
United States Virgin Islands male sprinters
Athletes (track and field) at the 1987 Pan American Games
Athletes (track and field) at the 1992 Summer Olympics
Athletes (track and field) at the 1996 Summer Olympics
Olympic track and field athletes of the United States Virgin Islands
Pan American Games competitors for the United States Virgin Islands